What The Night Delivers is the third album of British singer/songwriter Scott Matthews. The album marks Matthews' return to San Remo and Passing Stranger engineer Jon Cotton. The album contains various songs written during the course of the previous two albums, along with new tracks.

The album was officially released on 5 September 2011, though the album was made available to fans on 26 June.

The first single, "Ballerina Lake", was released on 19 August 2011. A three-track EP of "Obsession Never Sleeps" was released on 25 August.

Track listing
"Myself Again" – 5:15
"Obsession Never Sleeps" – 4:42
"Ballerina Lake" – 4:36
"Bad Apple" – 4:59
"So Long My Moonlight" – 4:29
"Head First Into Paradise" – 5:23
"Walking Home In The Rain" – 5:38
"Echoes Of The Lonely" – 4:06
"The Man Who Had Everything" – 5:45
"Piano Song" – 6:03

Personnel
Scott Matthews - vocals, guitars, bass guitar, sitar, theremin, piano
Sam Martin - drums, percussion
Danny Keane - cello
Greg Stoddard - lap steel guitar
Danny Thompson - double bass
Jon Cotton - Hammond organ, piano, vibraphone
Elspeth Dutch - French horn
Brass and string arrangements - Danny Keane
Produced, engineered, mixed and mastered by Jon Cotton

References

2011 albums
Scott Matthews albums